The province of Maluku in Indonesia is divided into nine regencies (kabupaten) and two independent cities (kota); these in turn are divided administratively into 118 districts known as Kecamatan. The 118 districts of Maluku, with the regency or city each falls into, are as follows:

Air Buaya, Buru
Amahai, Maluku Tengah
Amalatu, Seram Bagian Barat
Ambalau, Buru Selatan
Aru Selatan, Kepulauan Aru
Aru Selatan Timur, Kepulauan Aru
Aru Selatan Utara, Kepulauan Aru
Aru Tengah, Kepulauan Aru
Aru Tengah Selatan, Kepulauan Aru
Aru Tengah Timur, Kepulauan Aru
Aru Utara, Kepulauan Aru
Aru Utara Timur Batuley, Kepulauan Aru
Baguala, Ambon City
Banda, Maluku Tengah
Bata Bual, Buru
Bula, Seram Bagian Timur
Bula Barat, Seram Bagian Timur
Damer, Maluku Barat Daya
Dawelor Dawera, Maluku Barat Daya
Elpaputih, Seram Bagian Barat
Fena Fafan, Buru Selatan
Fena Leisela, Buru
Fordata, Kepulauan Tanimbar 
Gorom Timur, Seram Bagian Timur
Hoat Sorbay, Maluku Tenggara
Huamual, Seram Bagian Barat
Huamual Belakang, Seram Bagian Barat
Inamosol, Seram Bagian Barat
Kairatu, Seram Bagian Barat
Kairatu Barat, Seram Bagian Barat
Kei Besar, Maluku Tenggara
Kei Besar Selatan, Maluku Tenggara
Kei Besar Selatan Barat, Maluku Tenggara
Kei Besar Utara Barat, Maluku Tenggara
Kei Besar Utara Timur, Maluku Tenggara
Kei Kecil, Maluku Tenggara
Kei Kecil Barat, Maluku Tenggara
Kei Kecil Timur, Maluku Tenggara
Kei Kecil Timur Selatan, Maluku Tenggara
Kepala Madan, Buru Selatan
Kepulauan Manipa, Seram Bagian Barat
Kepulauan Romang, Maluku Barat Daya
Kian Darat, Seram Bagian Timur
Kilmury, Seram Bagian Timur
Kisar Utara, Maluku Barat Daya
Kormomolin, Kepulauan Tanimbar 
Kota Masohi, Maluku Tengah
Kur Selatan, Tual City
Leihitu, Maluku Tengah
Leihitu Barat, Maluku Tengah
Leitimur Selatan, Ambon City
Leksula, Buru Selatan
Lilialy, Buru
Lolong Guba, Buru
Manyeuw, Maluku Tenggara
Mdona Hiera, Maluku Barat Daya
Moa Lakor, Maluku Barat Daya
Molu Maru, Kepulauan Tanimbar 
Namlea, Buru
Namrole, Buru Selatan
Nirunmas, Kepulauan Tanimbar 
Nusa Laut, Maluku Tengah
Nusaniwe, Ambon City
Pulau Gorom, Seram Bagian Timur
Pulau Haruku, Maluku Tengah
Pulau Lakor, Maluku Barat Daya
Pulau Letti, Maluku Barat Daya
Pulau Masela, Maluku Barat Daya
Pulau Pulau Aru, Kepulauan Aru
Pulau Dullah Selatan, Tual City
Pulau Dullah Utara, Tual City
Pulau Panjang, Seram Bagian Timur
Pulau-Pulau Babar, Maluku Barat Daya
Pulau-Pulau Babar Timur, Maluku Barat Daya
Pulau-Pulau Kur, Tual City
Pulau-Pulau Terselatan, Maluku Barat Daya
Pulau Wetang, Maluku Barat Daya
Sala Hutu, Maluku Tengah
Saparua, Maluku Tengah
Saparua Timur, Maluku Tengah
Selaru, Kepulauan Tanimbar 
Seram Barat, Seram Bagian Barat
Seram Timur, Seram Bagian Timur
Seram Utara, Maluku Tengah
Seram Utara Barat, Maluku Tengah
Seram Utara Timur Kobi, Maluku Tengah
Seram Utara Timur Seti, Maluku Tengah
Sirimau, Ambon City
Siritaum Wida Timur, Seram Bagian Timur
Sir-Sir, Kepulauan Aru
Siwalalat, Seram Bagian Timur
Tanimbar Selatan, Kepulauan Tanimbar 
Tanimbar Utara, Kepulauan Tanimbar 
Taniwel, Seram Bagian Barat
Taniwel Timur, Seram Bagian Barat
Tayando Tam, Tual City
Tehoru, Maluku Tengah
Tehoru Elpaputik, Maluku Tengah
Telutih, Maluku Tengah
Teluk Ambon, Ambon City
Teluk Kaiely, Buru
Teluk Waru, Seram Bagian Timur
Teon Nila Serua, Maluku Tengah
Teor, Seram Bagian Timur
Tutuk Tolu, Seram Bagian Timur
Waeapo, Buru
Waelata, Buru
Waesama, Buru Selatan
Wakate, Seram Bagian Timur
Waplau, Buru
Wer Maktian, Kepulauan Tanimbar 
Werinama, Seram Bagian Timur
Wer Tamrian, Kepulauan Tanimbar 
Wetar, Maluku Barat Daya
Wetar Barat, Maluku Barat Daya
Wetar Timur, Maluku Barat Daya
Wetar Utara, Maluku Barat Daya
Wuar Labobar, Kepulauan Tanimbar

Villages
Administrative villages (desa) listed for each district:

References 

 
Maluku